Peripherally selective drugs have their primary mechanism of action outside of the central nervous system (CNS), usually because they are excluded from the CNS by the blood–brain barrier. By being excluded from the CNS, drugs may act on the rest of the body without producing side-effects related to their effects on the brain or spinal cord. For example, most opioids cause sedation when given at a sufficiently high dose, but peripherally selective opioids can act on the rest of the body without entering the brain and are less likely to cause sedation. These peripherally selective opioids can be used as antidiarrheals, for instance loperamide (Imodium).

Mechanisms of peripheral selectivity include physicochemical hydrophilicity and large molecular size, which prevent drug permeation through the lipid bilayer cell membranes of the blood–brain barrier, and efflux out of the brain by blood–brain barrier transporters such as P-glycoprotein among many others. Transport out of the brain by P-glycoprotein is thought to be responsible for the peripheral selectivity of many drugs, including loperamide, domperidone, fexofenadine, bilastine, cetirizine, ivermectin, and dexamethasone, among others.

Examples
 α-Methylserotonin – a serotonin receptor agonist
 Alvimopan – a μ-opioid receptor antagonist used in the treatment of postoperative ileus
 Anastrozole – an aromatase inhibitor used in the treatment of breast cancer
 Atenolol – a beta blocker
 Benserazide – an aromatic L-amino acid decarboxylase inhibitor used in combination with levodopa in the treatment of Parkinson's disease
 Bethanechol – a muscarinic acetylcholine receptor agonist used in the treatment of dry mouth and urinary retention
 Bicalutamide – an antiandrogen with peripheral selectivity in animals but seemingly not in humans
 Bilastine – a non-sedating antihistamine
 Bisoprolol – a beta blocker
 Carbachol – a non-selective acetylcholine receptor agonist used in the treatment of glaucoma
 Carbidopa – an aromatic L-amino acid decarboxylase inhibitor used in combination with levodopa in the treatment of Parkinson's disease
 Cetirizine – a non-sedating antihistamine
 Colchicine – an alkaloid and tubulin polymerization inhibitor used to treat gout
 Darolutamide – an antiandrogen used in the treatment of prostate cancer
 Desloratadine – a non-sedating antihistamine
 Dexamethasone – a glucocorticoid with some peripheral selectivity
 Digoxin – a cardiac glycoside and sodium–potassium pump inhibitor
 Domperidone – a D2 receptor antagonist used as an antiemetic, gastroprokinetic agent, and galactogogue
 Dopamine – a dopamine receptor agonist used as a cardiac stimulant and positive inotropic agent
 Eluxadoline – a μ- and κ-opioid receptor agonist and δ-opioid receptor antagonist used in the treatment of diarrhea-predominant irritable bowel syndrome
 Epinephrine (adrenaline) – an adrenergic receptor agonist used as a cardiac stimulant and in the treatment of anaphylaxis
 Fenoldopam – a D1 receptor agonist used as an antihypertensive agent
 Fexofenadine – a non-sedating antihistamine
 Fulvestrant – an antiestrogen used in the treatment of breast cancer
 GABA – a dietary supplement
 Glycopyrronium bromide – an anticholinergic
 Hyoscine butylbromide – an anticholinergic
 Itopride – a D2 receptor antagonist and acetylcholinesterase inhibitor used as a gastroprokinetic agent
 Ivermectin – an antiparasitic
 Labetalol – a beta blocker
 Levocetirizine – a non-sedating antihistamine
 Loperamide – a μ-opioid receptor agonist used as an antidiarrheal
 Loratadine – a non-sedating antihistamine
 Methacholine – a choline ester and muscarinic acetylcholine receptor agonist
 Methylhomatropine – an anticholinergic
 Methylnaltrexone – a μ-opioid receptor antagonist used in the treatment of opioid-induced constipation
 Metopimazine – a D2 receptor antagonist used in the treatment of nausea, vomiting, and gastroparesis
 Midodrine – an α1-adrenergic receptor agonist used in the treatment of orthostatic hypotension
 Nadolol – a beta blocker
 Naloxegol – a μ-opioid receptor antagonist used in the treatment of opioid-induced constipation
 Norepinephrine (noradrenaline) – an adrenergic receptor agonist
 Ondansetron – a 5-HT3 receptor antagonist with some peripheral selectivity
 Peptides and proteins (e.g., insulin, oxytocin, vasopressin, opioid peptides, growth factors, many others)
 Pirenzepine – an anticholinergic
 Pyridostigmine – an acetylcholinesterase inhibitor and parasympathomimetic
 Serotonin – a serotonin receptor agonist
 Sotalol – a beta blocker
 Terfenadine – a non-sedating antihistamine
 Timepidium bromide – an anticholinergic
 Trimetaphan camsilate – a nicotinic acetylcholine receptor antagonist
 Trospium chloride – an anticholinergic
 Vinblastine – a Vinca alkaloid and antineoplastic agent

References

External links